This is a list of notable fire lookout towers and stations, including complexes of associated buildings and structures. This includes lookout cabins without towers which are perched high and do not require further elevation to serve for their purpose, and also includes notable lookout trees.

There once were more than 10,000 fire lookout persons staffing more than 5,000 of fire lookout towers or fire lookout stations in the United States alone. Now there are far fewer of both. Also there are a number of fire lookout trees. The U.S. state of Wisconsin decided to close its last 72 operating fire lookout towers in 2016. Despite newer methods like aerial surveillance and cell phones, the U.S. state of Pennsylvania returned its use of fire lookout towers in 2017.

Australia
See :Category:Fire lookout towers in Australia

Fire stations with lookout towers:
Ballarat East Fire Station
Ballarat Fire Station
and a number of other fire stations in Australia

Towers alone:
Stringers Knob Fire Spotting Tower
Jimna Fire Tower
Mount Dale
Mount Gunjin, Western Australia
Mount Lofty Fire Tower
Waaje Fire Tower No.4

Fire lookout trees:
Dave Evans Bicentennial Tree
Gloucester Tree

Canada
Botanie Mountain

Romania
Foișorul de Foc

United Kingdom
National Emergency Services Museum, Sheffield, England

United States
The National Historic Lookout Register lists most historic, surviving fire towers in the United States.  Many of these are listed on the National Register of Historic Places and the Forest Fire Lookout Association.

Arizona
Atascosa Lookout House, Tubac, AZ, NRHP-listed
Barfoot Lookout Complex, Portal, AZ, NRHP-listed
Bear Mountain Lookout Complex, Mogollon Rim, AZ, NRHP-listed
Big Springs Lookout Tower, Big Springs, AZ, NRHP-listed
Buck Mountain Lookout Tower, Buck Mountain, AZ, NRHP-listed
Deer Springs Lookout Complex, Mogollon Rim, AZ, NRHP-listed
Diamond Point Lookout Cabin, Tonto Village, AZ, NRHP-listed
Dry Park Lookout Cabin and Storage Sheds, Big Springs, AZ, NRHP-listed
Grandview Lookout Tower and Cabin, Twin Lakes, AZ, NRHP-listed
Hyde Mountain Lookout House, Camp Wood, AZ, NRHP-listed
Jacob Lake Lookout Tower, Jacob Lake, AZ, NRHP-listed
Kendrick Lookout Cabin, Pumpkin Center, AZ, NRHP-listed
Lake Mountain Lookout Complex, McNary, AZ, NRHP-listed
Lee Butte Lookout Tower and Cabin, Happy Jack, AZ, NRHP-listed
Lemmon Rock Lookout House, Tucson, AZ, NRHP-listed
Mingus Lookout Complex, Mingus, AZ, NRHP-listed
Monte Vista Lookout Cabin, Elfrida, AZ, NRHP-listed
Moqui Lookout Cabin, Blue Ridge, AZ, NRHP-listed
Mormon Lake Lookout Cabin, Mormon Lake, AZ, NRHP-listed
Promontory Butte Lookout Complex, Beaver Park, AZ, NRHP-listed
PS Knoll Lookout Complex, Maverick, AZ, NRHP-listed
Silver Peak Lookout Complex, Portal, AZ, NRHP-listed
Volunteer Lookout Cabin, Bellemont, AZ, NRHP-listed
West Peak Lookout Tower, Bonita, AZ, NRHP-listed
Woody Mountain Lookout Tower, Flagstaff, AZ, NRHP-listed

Lookout trees
Lookout trees in Kaibab National Forest
Cooper Ridge Lookout Tree, Fredonia, AZ, NRHP-listed
Corral Lake Lookout Tree, Fredonia, AZ, NRHP-listed
Fracas Lookout Tree, Fredonia, AZ, NRHP-listed
Grandview Lookout Tree, Grand Canyon, AZ, NRHP-listed
Hull Tank Lookout Tree, Grand Canyon, AZ, NRHP-listed
Little Mountain Lookout Tree, Fredonia, AZ, NRHP-listed
Summit Mountain Lookout Tree, Williams, AZ, NRHP-listed
Tater Point Lookout Tree, Fredonia, AZ, NRHP-listed
Telephone Hill Lookout Tree, Fredonia, AZ, NRHP-listed
Tipover Lookout Tree, Fredonia, AZ, NRHP-listed
Tusayan Lookout Tree, Tusayan, AZ, NRHP-listed

Arkansas
Look See Tree
Crossroads Fire Tower, Hamburg, AR, NRHP-listed
Sugarloaf Fire Tower Historic District, Calico Rock, AR, NRHP-listed
Tall Peak Fire Tower, Athens, AR, NRHP-listed
Fort Lookout, Camden, AR, NRHP-listed

California
Some are related to the Angeles National Forest Fire Lookout Association. California had a total of 625 fire lookout sites, of those there are 198 remaining lookout towers, and of those there are around 50 staffed.  There are 11 lookouts that may be rented in California. Fire Lookouts not only watch for fire, they also record weather conditions and observe animals in some cases.

Alder Ridge Lookout (Eldorado National Forest)
Allen Lookout
American Camp Lookout (Stanislaus National Forest)
Angora Ridge Lookout
Annette Lookout
Antelope Mountain Lookout (Lassen National Forest)
Anthony Peak Lookout (Mendocino National Forest)
Argentine Rock Lookout (Plumas National Forest)
Armstrong Hill Lookout (Eldorado National Forest)
Babbit Peak Lookout (Tahoe National Forest)
Baker Point Lookout (Sequoia National Forest)
Black Butte (Siskiyou County, California)
Bald Mountain
Bald Mountain (Eldorado National Forest)
Bald Mountain (Inyo National Forest)
Bald Mountain (Sequoia National Forest)
Bald Mountain (Sierra National Forest)
Baldy Mountain (Klamath National Forest)
Ball Mountain Lookout (Klamath National Forest)
Baltic Peak Lookout (Eldorado National Forest)
Banner Mountain Lookout
Basalt Hill Lookout
Bear Mountain Lookout
Bear Mountain Lookout
Bear Mountain Lookout
Big Hill Lookout (Eldorado National Forest)
Big Hill Lookout
Black Fox Mountain Lookout (Shasta-Trinity National Forest)
Black Mountain Lookout
Black Mountain Lookout (Plumas National Forest)
Black Mountain Lookout (San Bernardino National Forest)
Black Rock Lookout  (Shasta-Trinity National Forest)
Black Ridge Lookout (Lassen National Forest)
Bloomer Hill Lookout (Plumas National Forest)
Blue Mountain Lookout (Modoc National Forest)
Blue Ridge Lookout (Klamath National Forest)
Bolivar Lookout (Klamath National Forest)
Bonanza King Lookout  (Shasta-Trinity National Forest)
Boucher Hill Lookout (Palomar Mountain State Park)
Branch Mountain Lookout (Los Padres National Forest)
Breckenridge Lookout (Sequoia National Forest)
Brush Mountain Lookout (Six Rivers National Forest)
Buck Rock Lookout (Sequoia National Forest)
Buckhorn Bally Lookout (Klamath National Forest)
Bully Choop Lookout
Bunker Hill Lookout (Eldorado National Forest)
Burney Mountain Lookout (Lassen National Forest)
Butler Peak Lookout (San Bernardino National Forest)
Cahto Peak Lookout (Mendocino National Forest)
Calandra Lookout
Call Mountain Lookout
Castro Peak Lookout
Chalone Peak Lookout (Pinnacles National Forest)
Chews Ridge Lookout in the Los Padres National Forest in Monterey County, California, NRHP-listed
Colby Mountain Lookout
Cold Spring Lookout
Collins Creek Baldy Lookout
Cone Peak Lookout, in the Los Padres National Forest in Monterey County, California
Copernicus Peak Lookout
Cotton Pass Fire Station and Lookout
Crane Flat Fire Lookout, Aspen Valley, CA, NRHP-listed
Cuyama Peak Lookout
Deadwood Peak Lookout
Delilah Lookout
Digger Butte Lookout
Dixie Mountain Lookout
Don Landon Lookout
Dow Butte Lookout
Duckwall Mountain Lookout
Duncan Peak Lookout
Duzel Rock Lookout
Dyer Mountain Lookout
Eagle Peak Lookout
Eddy Gulch Lookout
English Peak Lookout
Estelle Mountain Lookout
Fence Meadow Lookout
Figueroa Mountain Lookout
Fowler Peak Lookout
Frazier Mountain Lookout
Fredonyer Peak Lookout
Gardner Lookout
Goat Mountain Lookout
Grasshopper Peak Lookout
Green Mountain Lookout
Grouse Ridge Lookout
Happy Camp Lookout
Harvey Mountain Lookout
Hayden Hill Lookout
Hayfork Bally Lookout
Henness Ridge Fire Lookout (Yosemite National Park)
Herd Peak Lookout
Hi Mountain Lookout
High Glade Lookout
High Point Lookout
Hogback Mountain Lookout
Horse Ridge Lookout
Hot Springs Mountain Lookout
Howell Hill Lookout
Margarita Lookout (Clevland National Forest)
Mount Harkness Fire Lookout, in Lassen Volcanic National Park near Mineral, California, NRHP-listed
Prospect Peak Fire Lookout, in Lassen Volcanic National Park near Mineral, California, NRHP-listed
Sid Ormsbee Lookout, in The Santa Lucia Preserve near Carmel, California
Wolf Mountain Lookout

Lookout Rentals

Bear Basin Lookout (Six Rivers National Forest)
Black Mountain Lookout (Plumas National Forest)
Calpine Hill Lookout (Tahoe National Forest)
Girard Ridge Fire Lookout (Shasta-Trinity National Forest)
Hirz Mountain Lookout (Shasta-Trinity National Forest)
Little Mount Hoffman (Shasta-Trinity National Forest)
Mccarthy Point Lookout (Lassen National Forest)
Oak Flat (Sequoia National Forest)
Pine Mountain Lookout (Mendocino National Forest)
Post Creek Lookout (Shasta-Trinity National Forest)
Sardine Peak Lookout (Tahoe National Forest)

Colorado
Twin Sisters Lookout, Estes Park, CO, NRHP-listed
Lookout Mountain Park, Golden, CO, NRHP-listed
Fremont Lookout Fortification Site, Rangely, CO, NRHP-listed
Devils Head Lookout, Sedalia, CO, NRHP-listed
Shadow Mountain Lookout, Grand Lake, CO, NRHP-listed

Georgia
Chenocetah Fire Tower, Cornelia, GA, NRHP-listed
Lookout Mountain Fairyland Club, Lookout Mountain, GA, NRHP-listed

Idaho
Butts Point Creek Fire Lookout
Gardiner Peak Lookout
Salmon Mountain Lookout
Arctic Point Fire Lookout, Big Creek, ID, NRHP-listed
Carey Dome Fire Lookout, Burgdorf, ID, NRHP-listed
Mallard Peak Lookout, Avery, ID, NRHP-listed
Bishop Mountain Lookout, Island Park, ID, NRHP-listed
East Fork Lookout, Clayton, ID, NRHP-listed

Illinois
Union Lookout, Jonesboro, IL, NRHP-listed
Trigg Tower, Simpson, IL
Big River State Forest, Keithsburg, IL

Indiana
Hickory Ridge Fire Tower

Iowa
Yellow River Fire Tower

Louisiana

Massachusetts
Warwick Fire Tower
Massaemett Mountain

Michigan
Udell Lookout Tower, Wellston, MI, NRHP-listed

Mississippi
Moore Lookout Tower, Forest, MS, NRHP-listed

Missouri
Climax Springs Fire Tower
Knob Lick Fire Tower
Arrow Rock State Historic Site Lookout Shelter, Arrow Rock, MO, NRHP-listed
Meramec State Park Lookout House/Observation Tower, Sullivan, MO, NRHP-listed

Montana
Apgar Fire Lookout, West Glacier, MT, NRHP-listed
Carey Dome Fire Lookout
Clark's Lookout, August 13, 1805, Dillon, MT, NRHP-listed
Heaven's Peak Fire Lookout, West Glacier, MT, NRHP-listed
Hornet Lookout, Flathead National Forest, MT, NRHP-listed
Huckleberry Fire Lookout, Glacier National Park, NRHP-listed
Jumbo Fire Lookout, Hungry Horse, MT
Loneman Fire Lookout, West Glacier, MT, NRHP-listed
McCart Fire Lookout, Sula, MT, NRHP-listed
Mount Brown Fire Lookout, West Glacier, MT, NRHP-listed
Numa Ridge Fire Lookout, West Glacier, MT, NRHP-listed
Scalplock Mountain Fire Lookout, West Glacier, MT, NRHP-listed
Spotted Bear Fire Lookout, Hungry Horse, MT
Swiftcurrent Fire Lookout, West Glacier, MT, NRHP-listed

New Hampshire
The number of towers has varied over time, and aerial monitoring is also used. The following locations have fire towers as of 2020:

 Belknap Mountain
 Blue Job Fire Tower, Farmington
 Cardigan Mountain
 Federal Hill, Milford
 Green Mountain, Effingham
 Kearsarge North, Pequawket Fire Tower
 Magalloway Mountain 
 Milan Hill
 Pack Monadnock
 Oak Hill, Loudon
 Pawtuckaway State Park
 Pitcher Mountain
 Mount Prospect, Weeks State Park
 Red Hill
 Warner Hill

New Jersey
See List of New Jersey Forest Fire Service fire towers

New Mexico
Bearwallow Mountain Lookout Cabins and Shed, Bearwallow Park, NM, NRHP-listed
Black Mountain Lookout Cabin, Black Mountain, NM, NRHP-listed
Bluewater Lookout Complex, Weed, NM, NRHP-listed
Carrisa Lookout Complex, Long Canyon, NM, NRHP-listed
El Caso Lookout Complex, El Caso Lake, NM, NRHP-listed
Glorieta Baldy Lookout Tower, La Cueva, NM, NRHP-listed
Hillsboro Peak Lookout Tower and Cabin, Hillsboro, NM, NRHP-listed
Mangas Mountain Lookout Complex, Mangas, NM, NRHP-listed
Mogollon Baldy Lookout Cabin, Mogollon Baldy Peak, NM, NRHP-listed
Monjeau Lookout, Villa Madonna, NM, NRHP-listed
Reeds Peak Lookout Tower, Reeds Peak, NM, NRHP-listed
Ruidoso Lookout Tower, Ruidoso, NM, NRHP-listed
Weed Lookout Tower, Sacramento, NM, NRHP-listed
Wofford Lookout Complex, Cloudcroft, NM, NRHP-listed

New York
A number of fire lookout tower stations, including many in New York State near the Adirondack Forest Preserve and Catskill Park, have been listed on the National Register of Historic Places.  They include:

Adirondack Park
Arab Mountain Fire Observation Station, Piercefield, NY, NRHP-listed
Azure Mountain Fire Observation Station, Waverly, NY, NRHP-listed
Blue Mountain Fire Observation Station, Indian Lake, NY, NRHP-listed
Hadley Mountain Fire Observation Station, Hadley, NY, NRHP-listed
Hurricane Mountain Fire Observation Station, Keene, NY, NRHP-listed
Kane Mountain Fire Observation Station, Caroga, NY, NRHP-listed
Loon Lake Mountain Fire Observation Station, Franklin, NY, NRHP-listed
Lyon Mountain Fire Observation Station
Mount Adams Fire Observation Station, Newcomb, NY, NRHP-listed
Owls Head Mountain Forest Fire Observation Station
Pillsbury Mountain Forest Fire Observation Station, Arietta, NY, NRHP-listed
Poke-O-Moonshine Mountain Fire Observation Station, Chesterfield, NY, NRHP-listed
St. Regis Mountain Fire Observation Station, Santa Clara, NY, NRHP-listed
Snowy Mountain Fire Observation Station, Indian Lake, NY, NRHP-listed
Wakely Mountain Fire Observation Station, Lake Pleasant, NY, NRHP-listed

Catskill Park
Catskill Mountain fire towers
Balsam Lake Mountain Fire Observation Station, Hardenburgh, NY, NRHP-listed
Hunter Mountain Fire Tower, Hunter, NY, NRHP-listed
Mount Tremper Fire Observation Station, Shandaken, NY, NRHP-listed
Red Hill Fire Observation Station, Denning, NY, NRHP-listed

other
Dickinson Hill Fire Tower, Grafton, NY, NRHP-listed
Harlem Fire Watchtower, New York, NY, NRHP-listed
Mt. Beacon Fire Observation Tower, Beacon, NY, NRHP-listed
Sterling Mountain Fire Observation Tower and Observer's Cabin, Greenwood Lake, NY, NRHP-listed

North Carolina
Warren County Fire Tower
Cape Lookout Village Historic District, Harkers Island, NC, NRHP-listed
Warren County Fire Tower, Liberia, NC, NRHP-listed
US Naval Ordnance Testing Facility Observation Tower No. 2, Topsail Beach, NC

Oregon
Hager Mountain
Hershberger Mountain Lookout, Prospect, OR, NRHP-listed
Hoodoo Ridge Lookout
Kirkland Lookout Ground House (Guard Station), Joseph, OR, NRHP-listed
Mt. Stella Lookout, Prospect, OR, NRHP-listed
Pelican Butte
Squaw Peak Lookout, Jacksonville, OR, NRHP-listed
Yamsay Mountain
Waldo Mountain Fire Lookout
Watchman Lookout Station
Watchman Lookout Station No. 68, Fort Klamath, OR, NRHP-listed

Pennsylvania

South Dakota
not in category
Harney Peak Lookout Tower, Dam, Pumphouse and Stairway, Custer, SD, NRHP-listed
Fort Lookout IV, Oacoma, SD, NRHP-listed

Tennessee
Ripley Fire Lookout Tower, Ripley, TN, NRHP-listed

Utah
Ute Mountain Fire Tower, Manila, UT, NRHP-listed

Vermont
not in category
Stratton Mountain Lookout Tower, Stratton, VT, NRHP-listed

Washington
There are currently 93 lookouts in Washington State.

Alpine Lakes Wilderness
Thorp Mountain Lookout
Granite Mountain Lookout

Central North Cascades
Hidden Lake Peaks
Hidden Lake Peak Lookout, Marblemount, WA, NRHP-listed
Green Mountain Lookout, Darrington, WA, NRHP-listed
Miners Ridge Lookout, Darrington, WA, NRHP-listed
Lookout Mountain

Central Olympic Mountains
Dodger Point Fire Lookout, Port Angeles, WA, NRHP-listed

Chelan Mountains
Steliko Lookout

Columbia Gorge North
Red Mountain

Columbia-Yakima Hills
Satus Peak
Lorena Butte Lookout

Entiat Mountains
Tyee Mountain Lookout, Entiat, WA, NRHP-listed
Sugarloaf Peak Lookout, Leavenworth, WA, NRHP-listed

Glacier Peak-North Stevens Pass Area
Alpine Lookout
Evergreen Mountain Lookout, Skykomish, WA, NRHP-listed
Heybrook Ridge

Goat Rocks
Jumpoff Lookout

Hozameen Range
Monument 83 Peak
Desolation Peak Lookout, Hozameen, WA, NRHP-listed

Kettle River Range
Columbia Mountain
Grizzly Mountain Lookout
Lynx Mountain-Cabin Lookout Site
Cody Butte
Whitestone Ridge
Gold Mountain
Johnny George Mountain

Kitsap Peninsula
Kitsap Lookout

Methow Mountains
Lookout Mountain

Mount Adams Area
Mount Adams
Burley Mountain
Signal Peak
Meadow Butte

Mount Rainier Area
Mount Fremont Fire Lookout
Mt. Fremont Fire Lookout, Sunrise, WA, NRHP-listed
Tolmie Peak Fire Lookout, Mowich Lake Entrance, WA, NRHP-listed
High Rock
Gobbler's Knob Fire Lookout, Nisqually Entrance, WA, NRHP-listed
Sun Top Lookout, Enumclaw, WA, NRHP-listed
Puyallup Ridge Lookout
Watch Mountain-West Peak
Goodman Hill

Mountain Loop Area
Three Fingers Lookout, Darrington, WA, NRHP-listed
Mount Pilchuck Lookout
North Mountain Lookout
Darrington Ranger Station Lookout Site

North-Central Olympic Mountains
Ned Hill

Northern Blue Mountains
Oregon Butte
Table Rock
Clearwater Lookout
Big Butte

Northwest Olympics
North Point
Pyramid Peak Aircraft Warning Service Lookout, Port Angeles, WA, NRHP-listed

Okanogan Range
Slate Peak
North Twentymile Peak
Goat Peak
Mebee Pass Lookout
Buck Mountain
First Butte
Aeneas Mountain
Funk Mountain
Mount Leecher
Leecher Crow's Nest Lookout Site
Knowlton Knob
Okanogan Post Office Lookout Site
Priest Lake Selkirks
Salmo Mountain Lookout
Sullivan Mountain
South Baldy Lookout
Indian Mountain
Diamond Peak - Patrol Lookout Site

San Juan Islands
Mount Constitution

Skagit Range
Winchester Mountain Lookout, Sedro Wooley, WA, NRHP-listed
Copper Mountain Fire Lookout, Newhalem, WA, NRHP-listed
Sourdough Mountain Lookout, Diablo, WA, NRHP-listed
Park Butte Lookout, Sedro Wooley, WA, NRHP-listed

South Cascade Crest
Shriner Peak
Kelly Butte

South Okanogan Highlands
Mount Bonaparte
Moses Mountain
Tunk Mountain
Strawberry Mountain
Omak Mountain
Cornell Butte
Keller Butte
Armstrong Mountain
Whitmore Mountain
Whitmore L-4 Cab Lookout Site
Franson Peak
Southwest Selkirks
Mount Spokane
Timber Mountain
Quartz Mountain
Tower Mountain
Wellpinit Mountain
Lookout Mountain
Wenatchee Mountains
Red Top Mountain

Not in Category
Aircraft Warning Service Observation Tower, Agnew, WA
Kloshe Nanitch Lookout
Badger Mountain Lookout, East Wenatchee, WA, NRHP-listed
Chelan Butte Lookout, Chelan, WA, NRHP-listed

lookout trees
Cook Creek Spar Tree, cut down in 1955 due to rot,
Lookout tree constructed in 1918 near Darrington, Washington; abandoned as a lookout in the 1930s, it can be reached by the Lookout Tree Trail.

West Virginia
Olson Observation Tower

Wisconsin
Fifield Fire Lookout Tower, Fifield, WI, NRHP-listed
Mountain Fire Lookout Tower, Riverview, WI, NRHP-listed

Wyoming
Huckleberry Mountain Fire Lookout, Teton National Forest, WY, NRHP-listed

See also
List of fire stations
List of towers
List of observation towers

References

Fire lookout towers
Lookout towers
Fire